Śródmieście was a district of the city of Szczecin, Poland, that functioned from 1954 to 1976.

History 
Śródmieście was established on 7 October 1954, as one of four district of the city of Szczecin, Poland. The other three districts were: Dąbie, Nad Odrą, and Pogodno. It bordered Pogodno to the west, Nad Odrą to the north, and Dąbie to the east. In 1961, it incorporated the district of Pomorzany from Pogodno. In 1961, it was inhabited by 143 039 people. It existed until 19 November 1976, when the district were abolished.

The city was again divided into districts in 1990. The former area of Śródmieście was divided between Śródmieście, and Zachód.

Subdivisions 
The district was subdivided into 6 administrative neighbourhoods.

Citations

Notes

References 

Srodmiescie
Srodmiescie
Srodmiescie
Srodmiescie
Srodmiescie